Alexander Dewar Munro (6 April 1912 – 29 August 1986) was a Scottish professional football player.

Club career
Born in the West Lothian village of Carriden, Bo'ness, Munro began his career with Bo'ness F.C., before reverting to junior football with Champfleurie and Newtongrange Star. He returned to league football when signed by Hearts in April 1932 and had gradually worked his way into the first team by 1934, appearing mainly as a left-winger. He switched to the right flank from 1934–35 and that season helped Hearts to the Scottish Cup semi-finals, playing in both games as Double-winning Rangers proved too strong in a replay at Hampden Park.

Munro joined Blackpool in March 1937 for £3,500. He went on to spend thirteen years with the Tangerines, making 136 league appearances and scoring seventeen goals for them. This total would have been considerably greater but for the disruption of the Second World War, during which time he "guested" for Middlesbrough and Brighton and Hove Albion.

Upon his playing retirement in 1950 Munro joined the Blackpool coaching staff. He was later to serve the club as a scout.

Munro's son, also called Alex Munro, was also a professional footballer, playing in England and South Africa.

International career
Munro won three caps for Scotland (the first two during his Hearts days; the other while with Blackpool) and scored one goal, against Ireland on 31 October 1936.

References

Sources

External links

Hearts appearances at londonhearts.com

1912 births
1986 deaths
Scottish footballers
Scotland international footballers
Bo'ness F.C. players
Heart of Midlothian F.C. players
Blackpool F.C. players
People from Bo'ness
Scottish Football League players
English Football League players
Scottish Junior Football Association players
Newtongrange Star F.C. players
Footballers from Falkirk (council area)
Middlesbrough F.C. wartime guest players
Brighton & Hove Albion F.C. wartime guest players
Blackpool F.C. non-playing staff
Association football wingers
FA Cup Final players